The Big Ten Conference Women's Basketball Coach of the Year is an annual college basketball award presented to the top women's basketball coach in the Big Ten Conference. The winner is selected by the Big Ten media association and conference coaches. The award was first given following the 1983–84 season to Tara VanDerveer of Ohio State. Rene Portland, Jim Foster, and Brenda Frese have won the award a record four times each.

Key

Winners

Winners by school

References

Awards established in 1984
NCAA Division I women's basketball conference coaches of the year
Coach of the Year